The Battle of Hutong was a military conflict which occurred on 10 June 1658 between the Tsardom of Russia and the Qing dynasty and Joseon. It resulted in Russian defeat.

Background
In 1657, Šarhūda commissioned the construction of large warships which could stand up to the Russian vessels. By the next year, 52 vessels had been produced, 40 of which were large and mounted with cannons of various sizes.

Sin Ryu's 260 musketeers arrived at Ningguta on 9 May. A day later, the allied forces set sail towards the mouth of the Songhua River. After five days, they ran into a group of Duchers who informed them that the Russians were in the area. They waited there for fifty of Šarhūda's newly built warships to arrive. The war fleet arrived on 2 June and set sail again three days later.

Battle
The allied forces encountered Onufriy Stepanov's fleet on 10 June. The Russians set up a defensive formation along a riverbank, where they exchanged fire with the Qing ships to no great effect. Once the allied forces closed in, the Cossacks broke formation and fled to shore or hid in their ships. Just as the Korean forces were about to set fire to the Russian ships, Šarhūda halted them because he wanted to keep the ships as booty. Taking advantage of the brief lull in battle, the Cossacks counterattacked, killing many of the allied forces. Forty Cossacks managed to board a deserted Qing vessel and flee but they were eventually hunted down and slaughtered. The Russian ships were destroyed using fire arrows.

Aftermath
The Russian defeat cost them control of the lower Amur region up to Nerchinsk, where only 76 Cossacks garrisoned the fortress. Half these men deserted the outpost soon after. Although a group of independent Cossacks would return to Albazin in the 1660s, the Russian state withdrew most of its commitment to the Amur region, leaving it a no man's land.

References

Bibliography
 .

 

17th-century conflicts
Military history of Manchuria
History of Siberia
History of Amur Oblast
Wars involving the Qing dynasty
Wars involving Russia
Wars involving Joseon
History of the Cossacks in Russia
17th-century military history of Russia
China–Russia military relations
Eight Banners